NSPF may refer to:

 National Swimming Pool Foundation, a United States 501(c)(3) non-profit organization
 Norsk Speiderpikeforbund, a national jamboree in the Norwegian Guide and Scout Association
 No Single Point of Failure, a concept in systems engineering